Ronald L. Davis is an American law enforcement officer. He is Director of the United States Marshals Service.

Education 
Davis earned a Bachelor of Science degree in workforce education and development from Southern Illinois University Carbondale.

Career 
Davis was an officer in the Oakland Police Department for 20 years and later served as chief of the East Palo Alto Police Department for eight years. In 2014, Davis was selected as executive director of the President's Task Force on 21st Century Policing. Davis later served as director of Community Oriented Policing Services in the United States Department of Justice.

On September 27, 2021, he was sworn in as Director of the United States Marshals Service.

References 

Living people
Southern Illinois University Carbondale alumni
United States Marshals
Obama administration personnel
Biden administration personnel
Oakland Police Department
Year of birth missing (living people)